"Evergreen (You Didn't Deserve Me at All)" (album version titled "Evergreen") is a song by American singer Omar Apollo. On October 4, 2022, it was sent to contemporary hit radio after it had gone viral on TikTok in September 2022. The song serves as the eighth single off Apollo's debut studio album Ivory.

Background
The song originally appeared on Apollo's debut studio album Ivory, simply titled "Evergreen". A few months after the album's release, the song went viral on TikTok. By the end of the month, a snippet of the song had been used in over 300,000 clips. Apollo performed the song as part of his Tiny Desk Concert on September 15, 2022, which caused another surge in streams.

Reception

Critical response 
Rolling Stone listed "Evergreen (You Didn't Deserve Me at All)" as one of the best songs of 2022, placing it at number 29, and wrote: "...as teardrop guitar licks spill against the soft edges of his falsetto. Apollo packs it all in there — anger, anguish, self-loathing, doubt — but still builds to a bridge bursting with defiant confidence. [...] Apollo has always excelled at these kinds of songs, and it’s thrilling that such a superb display of his skills has finally scored him a well-deserved place on the charts and the broader pop ecosystem."

Commercial performance 
In North America, "Evergreen (You Didn't Deserve Me at All)" debuted at number 62 on the US Billboard Hot 100, for the week ending October 2, 2022. Two weeks later, it peaked at number 51. While in Canada, it peaked at number 43.

In Europe, the song entered the top 5 of the Netherlands' song chart and the top 40 of Ireland and the UK's charts. In Oceania, it has since peaked in the top 20 at number 12 in New Zealand and the top 40 at number 33 in Australia.

Music video
The accompanying music video was premiered on November 19, 2022. It depicts Apollo on a soundstage where a house is being put together only to be blown apart with him in the middle of it but winds up being eventually rebuilt at the end.

Accolades

Year-end lists

Charts

Certifications

Release history

References 

2020s ballads
2022 singles
2022 songs
LGBT-related songs
Omar Apollo songs
Songs about heartache